Godfred Seidu Jasaw (born 14 March 1977) is a Ghanaian politician and member of the National Democratic Congress. He is the member of parliament for the Wa East constituency in the Upper West Region of Ghana .

Early life and education 
Jasaw was born in Jeriyi on Monday, 14 March 1977. He holds a PHD (Sustainability science) – 2016,BSc (Agricultural Economics) – 2005.

Politics 
Jasaw was elected as a member of parliament for the Wa East constituency during the 2020 general elections. He was able to poll 16259 vote (59.99%).

Personal life 
Jasaw is an Islam.

References 

1977 births
Living people
Ghanaian Muslims
National Democratic Congress (Ghana) politicians
Ghanaian MPs 2021–2025